

1915

Non-circulating coins

1916

Non-circulating coins

1917

Non-circulating coins

1918

Non-circulating coins

References 

Commemorative coins of the United States